The Campaign  is a 2012 American political satire comedy film directed by Jay Roach, written by Shawn Harwell and Chris Henchy and stars Will Ferrell and Zach Galifianakis as two North Carolinians vying for a seat in Congress. The film was released on August 10, 2012, by Warner Bros Pictures, to mixed reviews from critics.

Plot
Democratic Congressman Camden Brady, who has run unopposed for the fictional 14th District in North Carolina is exposed when he has an affair with a supporter, damaging his upcoming campaign for a fifth term. Glenn and Wade Motch, two corrupt businessmen persuade tour guide Martin Huggins to run as Camden's opposition as a Republican nominee. The Motch Brothers ultimately intend to use Martin to forward a profitable scheme with a Chinese company.

Campaign Manager Tim Wattley (also in the pay of the Motch Brothers) transforms Martin into a successful entrepreneur and family man, which pays off during his first debate with Camden and takes the viewers by storm with his resolve to bring back jobs to North Carolina. At a town hall debate, a fight breaks out between Camden and Huggins supporters after Huggins uses Rainbowland, a story written by Camden as a child, to accuse him of being a Communist; Camden and Huggins also end up fighting, being unable to hear each other over the commotion but believing that they were insulting. Camden further damages his campaign when he accidentally punches a dog and a baby, on both occasions having intended to hit Huggins. In response, Camden runs a campaign portraying Martin as an Al Qaeda terrorist (based on Martin's facial hair). Camden later realizes his son intends to use his father's campaign methods against his opponent for Class President, and realizes he is setting a bad example. Camden travels to Martin's home to make peace, but ends up getting drunk and is arrested for drunk driving when Martin, encouraged by Tim, reports him. Martin then airs another TV advertisement, with Camden's son addressing him as "dad". Furious, Camden seduces Martin's wife Mitzi and records them having sex before releasing it as a campaign ad. This forces his Campaign Manager Mitch Wilson to resign on principle, and prompts his wife to leave him and take their children with her, leaving Camden despondent about the coming election. Martin leaves Mitzi as a result of the ad, but gets revenge on Camden by shooting him during a hunting trip, causing his popularity to further increase. However, Camden's popularity recovers after a mishap at a snake handling ceremony results in him being hospitalized.

Martin meets with the Motch brothers soon afterwards, but learns of their "insourcing" plans with China; they intend to turn the 14th district into a factory complex and import Chinese workers in order to reduce shipping costs. Martin, realizing he has been used, rejects their support. The Motch brothers in turn defect to Camden's side, revitalizing his campaign and paying his wife to appear alongside him at campaign events to give the impression of reconciliation. Meanwhile, Martin reconciles with his wife and family, and desperately appeals to the voters by revealing the Motch Brothers' plans and promising to be completely honest (revealing several embarrassing secrets about himself in doing so). On election day, however, Camden wins due to the voting machines being rigged by the brothers. Camden gloats about his victory to Martin, who recalls to Camden that he was the Class President at their school, and had removed a dangerous slide that had scarred the both of them. Martin tells Camden that this greatly inspired him. Realizing what he has done and who he has become, Camden denounces his win in the election and withdraws, and Martin wins by default. Martin and Camden become friends, with Camden being appointed Martin's chief of staff.

Six months later, the Motch brothers are called to appear before Congress after being exposed by Martin and Camden. The brothers point out that everything they have done is legal under Citizens United v. FEC but are arrested due to their association with Wattley, who is in fact an international fugitive.

Cast

WWE wrestler The Miz makes a cameo appearance as himself.

Production
Principal photography for the film, originally titled Dog Fight, began November 14, 2011, and continued through February 2012 in New Orleans, Hammond, and on the West Bank.

The film opens with a quote from Texas businessman Ross Perot, stating he was a 1988 presidential candidate. Perot didn't run for president until 1992 and 1996.

Music
The film's score was composed by Theodore Shapiro.

The Green Day song "99 Revolutions", from the album ¡Tré!, plays over the end credits.

Musical interludes and "Takin' Care of Business" performed by a group of musicians consisting of members from the Pride of The Plains Marching Band (Pittsburg State University) and local residents of Pittsburg, Kansas under the direction of Dr. Doug Whitten.

Themes
The film lampoons modern American elections and the influence of corporate money. It directly satirizes the Koch brothers with another pair of ultra-wealthy siblings: the Motch brothers. The film also alluded to the British Conservative Party's New Labour, New Danger campaign.

Release
The film was released by Warner Bros. Pictures on August 10, 2012. The Blu-ray and DVD release was on October 30, 2012.

Reception

Box office
Despite performing better than expected on its opening day by grossing $10.3 million, and grossing $26.6 million in its opening weekend, finishing second at the box office behind The Bourne Legacy ($38.1 million), The Campaign was a financial disappointment, grossing $86.9 million in the U.S. and Canada and $18 million in other territories, for a total gross of $104.9 million against a $95 million budget.

Critical response
On Rotten Tomatoes the film holds an approval rating of 66% based on 204 reviews, with an average rating of 5.94/10. The site's critical consensus states: "Its crude brand of political satire isn't quite as smart or sharp as one might hope in an election year, but The Campaign manages to generate a sufficient number of laughs thanks to its well-matched leads." Metacritic gives the film a weighted average score of 50 out of 100, based on 35 critics, indicating "mixed or average reviews". Audiences polled by CinemaScore gave the film an average grade of "B−" on an A+ to F scale.

Richard Roeper of the Chicago Sun-Times gave the film an A- and described it as "one of the best comedies of the year" where "the material is offensively funny, but the laughs are very consistent".

References

External links

 
 

2012 films
2010s political comedy films
American political comedy films
American political satire films
2010s English-language films
Films about elections
Films directed by Jay Roach
Films produced by Adam McKay
Films produced by Will Ferrell
Films set in North Carolina
Films shot in Louisiana
Films shot in New Orleans
Gary Sanchez Productions films
Films with screenplays by Adam McKay
Warner Bros. films
Films scored by Theodore Shapiro
Films produced by Zach Galifianakis
2012 comedy films
2010s American films